The Driekleur trikot (tricolor jersey in Flemish) is an emblematic cycling jersey awarded to the Belgian National Road Race Champion and the Belgian National Time Trial Champion. The road race champion can wear it in any race except races ridden as a national team, and time trials. In this last case he can wear it only in time trial stages (individual or by team). Neither would be worn if the rider is a leader of a classification in a stage races.

The Driekleur trikot is also awarded to the winners at the Belgian National Cyclo-cross Championships.

The jersey design reflects the Belgian national flag and has a black upper, a gold centre band and a red lower section.

National road cycling championships
Cycle racing in Belgium
Cycling jerseys